Welshpool is a market town and community in Powys, Wales, historically in the county of Montgomeryshire. The community includes Cloddiau and Pool Quay.

In English it was initially known as Pool but its name was changed to Welshpool in 1835 to distinguish it from the English town of Poole. The community had a population of 6,664 (as of the 2011 United Kingdom census), with the town having 5,948. It contains much Georgian architecture and is just north of Powis Castle.

History

St Cynfelin is reputed to be the founder of two churches in the town, St Mary's and St Cynfelin's, during "the age of the saints in Wales" in the 5th and 6th centuries.

The parish of Welshpool roughly coincides with the medieval commote of Ystrad Marchell in the cantref of Ystlyg in the Kingdom of Powys.

The Long Mountain, which plays as a backdrop to most of Welshpool, once served as the ultimate grounds for defence for fortresses in the times when the town was just a swampy marsh.

Welshpool served briefly as the capital of Powys Wenwynwyn or South Powys after its prince was forced to flee the traditional Welsh royal site at Mathrafal in 1212, by the prince of Gwynedd; assistance from the English crown (enemies of the Gwynedd prince) restored the Wenwynwyn dynasty to their lands. Further disputes with Gwynedd again brought in the English; in 1284, the family strengthened their hold on Powys Wenwynwyn by converting it into a marcher lordship (via surrender and re-grant) - the Lordship of Powys. Owain, the heir to the former principality, called himself Owen de la Pole, after the town.

The town was devastated by the forces of Owain Glyndŵr (heir to Powys Fadog - North Powys) in 1400 at the start of his rebellion against the English king Henry IV. Today, the waymarked, 135-mile long-distance footpath and National Trail, Glyndŵr's Way, ends in Pont Howell Park, alongside the Montgomery Canal.

In 1411 the priest at the church St Mary's was Adam of Usk.

Population

The population of Welshpool has risen since 2001.

Villages
 

Gungrog

Historic buildings

 
St Mary's Church is a Grade I listed building. The original church dated from about 1250,  there are remains of this church in the lower courses of the church tower. The nave was rebuilt in the 16th century, and the whole building was substantially restored in 1871. A memorial in the church commemorates Bishop William Morgan, translator of the Bible into Welsh, who was the vicar from 1575 to 1579.

The Mermaid Inn, 28 High Street, was very probably an early 16th-century merchant's house, placed on a burgage plot between the High Street and Alfred Jones Court. The timber-framed building has long storehouse or wing to the rear. The frontage was remodelled  1890, by Frank H. Shayler, architect, of Shrewsbury. Early illustrations of the building show that prior to this it had a thatched roof and that the timbering was not exposed. There is a passage to side with heavy box-framing in square panels, with brick infill exposed in side elevation and in rear wing. The frontage was exposed by Shayler to show decorative timber work on the upper storey. An Inn by the 19th century when it was owned by a family named Sparrow.

There is an octagonal brick cockpit in New Street, which was built in the early 18th century and was in continual use for cockfighting until the practice was outlawed by the Cruelty to Animals Act 1849. , it is the home of the town's Women's Institute. Welshpool Town Hall, which was completed in 1874, is a Grade II listed building.

Transport
Welshpool railway station is on the Cambrian Line and is served by Transport for Wales. The town is also the starting point of the Welshpool and Llanfair Light Railway, a narrow-gauge heritage railway popular with tourists, with its terminus station at Raven Square. The light railway once ran through the town to the Cambrian Line railway station, but today Raven Square, located on the western edge of the town, is the eastern terminus of the line.

A small network of bus services link surrounding towns and villages, mainly operated by Tanat Valley Coaches. Notable is service No X75, serving Shrewsbury to the east and Newtown and Llanidloes to the south west, also service No D71 to Oswestry via Guilsfield and Llanymynech. In addition there is a local town service operated by Owen's Coaches. The semi-disused Montgomery Canal also runs through Welshpool. To the south of the town is Welshpool Airport which is also known as the Mid Wales Airport.  Three major trunk roads pass through Welshpool: the A458, A483 and the A490.

Economy
The local economy is primarily based upon agriculture and local industry. The Smithfield Livestock Market is the largest one-day sheep market in Europe. Market days are on Mondays.

The town's industrial estates are home to numerous different types of small industry, ranging from metal to food production. Due to the town's small size and population the attraction of high street stores and stores that cut keys is limited, meaning that many of the residents prefer to shop in neighbouring towns like Shrewsbury. However Welshpool remains an important hub serving its agricultural hinterland. The town is home to the headquarters of the Montgomeryshire Wildlife Trust and the Clwyd-Powys Archaeological Trust.

Education
The town is the home of Ardwyn Nursery and Infants School, Oldford Nursery and Infants School, Gungrog Nursery and Infants School, Maes-y-dre Primary School. Welshpool High School is a secondary school which teaches a range of pupils from ages 11–18 and has a good standard of education throughout Key Stage 3 and 4 and GCSE studies.

Sport
Welshpool has a football club (Welshpool Town F.C.) and a rugby union club (Welshpool Rugby Football Club). The football club was jointly managed for a period in the late 2010s by Chris Roberts and Neil Pryce but with little success. The town also has hockey and cricket clubs. The Montgomeryshire Marauders Rugby League Club are also nominally based in Welshpool, as this is where the majority of their home fixtures take place.

Notable people

William Morgan (1545-1604), Bible translator, Vicar of Welshpool 1575-79, became Bishop of St Asaph in 1601
Sampson Lloyd (1664–1724), iron manufacturer in early Birmingham, founder of the Lloyd family of Birmingham
Lieutenant-General Sir Percy Egerton Herbert KCB PC (1822 in Powis Castle – 1876), Army officer and politician.
Sir William Boyd Dawkins FRS FSA FGS (1837 in Buttington – 1929), geologist and archaeologist.
William Herbert Waring VC (1885-1918), Victoria Cross recipient in World War I.
Roderick Urwick Sayce FRGS FRAI FMA (1890–1970), social anthropologist and geographer
Ann Mercy Hunt MBE (1938–2014), medical researcher and campaigner; co-founded the Tuberous Sclerosis Association
Glyn Davies (born 1944), a former politician and MP for Montgomeryshire from 2010 to 2019.
Craig Williams (born 1985), politician, MP for Cardiff North, 2015 to 2017 and for Montgomeryshire from 2019. PPS to PM.

Sport 
Jack Roscamp (1901-1939). footballer notably for Blackburn Rovers, was a publican in his latter years when he kept The Boot Inn in the town.
George Bennett (1913 in Forden – 1970), a rugby union and professional rugby league footballer with 383 caps
Ian Hutchinson (born 1964), county cricketer for Middlesex and Shropshire. 27 first class caps

Gallery

Notes

External links

Photos of Welshpool and surrounding area on geograph.org.uk

Welshpool Seven Stars Halt railway station Welshpool's Seven Stars Halt.

 
Populated places on the River Severn
Towns in Powys
Towns of the Welsh Marches
Communities in Powys